Semecarpus coriaceus is a species of plant in the family Anacardiaceae. It is endemic to Sri Lanka. The specific epithet was originally spelt coriacea.

References

Flora of Sri Lanka
coriaceus
Endangered plants
Taxonomy articles created by Polbot